The RagWing RW19 Stork is a family of two-seat, high wing, strut-braced, conventional landing gear, single-engine homebuilt aircraft designed by Roger Mann and sold as plans by RagWing Aircraft Designs for amateur construction.

The RW19 is a 75% scale replica of the Fieseler Storch Second World War German liaison aircraft. The RW19 is noted for its STOL performance, equal to or better than that of the original Storch. The claimed take-off run and landing roll are  due to a  stall speed.

Design and development
The RW19 was designed for the US experimental homebuilt aircraft category and was first flown in August 1997. It also qualifies as an Experimental Light-sport aircraft in the USA.

The airframe is constructed from wood and tube and covered with aircraft fabric. The landing gear is of conventional configuration.

The RW19 was originally available as a complete kit, less only the engine, but today is only offered as plans. The designer estimates it will take 600 hours to complete the aircraft, although other estimates run from 300 to 1500 hours.

Variants
RW19 Stork
Tandem seat version
RW20 Stork Side by Side
Side-by-side seating version, performance the same as the tandem seat version

Specifications (RW19)

See also

References

External links
Archive of the official website RW19
Archive of the official website RW20

Homebuilt aircraft
Light-sport aircraft
Single-engined tractor aircraft
High-wing aircraft
STOL aircraft
Aircraft first flown in 1997